Rosario Angelo Livatino (October 3, 1952 – September 21, 1990) was an Italian magistrate who was killed by Stidda.

Biography
Livatino was born in Canicattì, in Sicily. After successfully completing high school, he entered the university Law Faculty in Palermo in 1971, and graduated in 1975. Between 1977 and 1978 he serviced as vice-director in the Register Office in Agrigento. In 1978, after being among the top percentage in the Judiciary audit, he was assigned a post as magistrate at the court at Caltanissetta.

In 1979 he became "sostituto procuratore" (deputy prosecutor) at the Agrigento court, a  position he kept until 1989, when he was appointed assistant judge (giudice a latere). He was murdered on September 21, 1990, along route SS 640 by four killers, as he  travelled without bodyguard to the court.  The assassins had been paid by the Stidda of Agrigento.

During his career, Livatino worked against corruption, and gained success in a number of cases, obtaining the seizure of large sums of money and property and the arrest of senior figures in organised crime.

His story inspired a novel, Il giudice ragazzino ("The Boy Judge"), written by Nando Dalla Chiesa in 1992, and this was made into a film with the same title in 1994 by director Alessandro di Robilant.

Beatification process
In 1993 the Bishop of Agrigento asked Rosario Livatino's former teacher, Ida Abate, to collect any available testimony for  Livatino's beatification.

Pope John Paul II said that Rosario Livatino was a "Martyr of Justice and in an indirect way, of the Christian Faith".

In December 2020, Pope Francis approved the decree of martyrdom proposed by the Vatican’s Congregation for the Causes of Saints. Servant of God Rosario Angelo Livatino has been officially proclaimed Blessed on Sunday, 9 May 2021, in the Cathedral of Agrigento, Sicily by Cardinal Marcello Semeraro, Prefect of the Congregation for the Causes of Saints on the same day John Paul II, in 1993, at the Valley of the Temples, addressed his peremptory invitation to the Mafia: "Convert! once God's judgment will come!

See also
List of victims of the Sicilian Mafia

References

External links 

 Associazione Livatino
 Rosario Livatino - Il giudice ragazzino -
   I giudici R. Livatino e A. Saetta  

1952 births
1990 deaths
People from Canicattì
Assassinated Italian judges
People murdered by the Sicilian Mafia
Antimafia
Italian Servants of God
Jurists from Sicily
Italian murder victims
Beatifications by Pope Francis